Rodrick Hill (born March 14, 1959) is a former American football cornerback in the National Football League (NFL) for the Dallas Cowboys, Buffalo Bills, Detroit Lions, and Los Angeles Raiders. After his NFL career he played five seasons with the Winnipeg Blue Bombers and still holds the career interception record by a player for that franchise. He played college football at Kentucky State University.

Early years
Hill attended Martin Luther King High School. He accepted a scholarship to the University of Iowa, where as a wide receiver, he felt he had few opportunities to prove his worth in the team's run-oriented offense. He decided to transfer to Kentucky State University at the end of his first semester. 

As a sophomore, he was converted into a cornerback to take advantage of his athleticism. He had 5 interceptions (led the team) and 25 punt returns for a 21.7-yard average (led the NAIA). Against Morris Brown College, he made 2 interceptions and returned a punt for a 77-yard touchdown. Against Central State University, he returned a punt for an 87-yard touchdown.

As a junior, he registered 2 interceptions (led the team) and led the NAIA with a 31.8-yard average on 18 punt returns. He posted 30.1-yard average on 9 kickoff returns. He missed 3 contests with a sprained ankle.

Hill finished his college career with 8 career interceptions and was considered an excellent return specialist, returning 50 punts for 1,182 yards (school-record 23.6-yards average) and 31 kickoffs for a 22.5 yard average. As a senior, he played in the East–West Shrine Game and the Senior Bowl.

In 2000, he was inducted into the Kentucky State University Athletics Hall of Fame. In 2011, he was inducted into the Kentucky Pro Football Hall of Fame.

Professional career

Dallas Cowboys
After private workouts with defensive assistant coach Gene Stallings and being rated very high for his athletic abilities, the Dallas Cowboys selected Hill in the first round (25th overall) of the 1982 NFL Draft. The team used him as a nickel cornerback and special teams returner, but struggled in both roles. He replaced an injured Ron Fellows late in the season and the playoffs.

He had irregular performances in the  1982 playoff games. Against the Tampa Bay Buccaneers, he was replaced with Monty Hunter, after he missed a tackle that allowed Gordon Jones to have a 49-yard touchdown reception, for a 17-16 third quarter lead. The next game was his finest moment as a Cowboy, besides playing a key role as the nickel cornerback on passing downs in a 37-26 victory against the Green Bay Packers, in the third quarter he returned a kickoff 89 yards (tied for second in NFL playoff history), which led to a key field goal and in the fourth quarter he also blocked a Jan Stenerud conversion kick. Conversely, in the Washington Redskins playoff game, his goal line muffed punt contributed to the team loss.

Hill continued to struggle in 1983 and lost the nickel cornerback position to Fellows. Eventually his teammates also started to turn on him, so the Cowboys traded him to the Buffalo Bills in the 1984 offseason, in exchange for a fifth round draft choice (#119-Matt Darwin) in 1985, plus a sixth (#140-Thornton Chandler) and a twelfth selection (#307-Chris Duliban) in 1986. In Cowboys lore, Hill would become the symbol of the failed draft strategy of the Eighties decade, when the team took too many gambles.

Buffalo Bills
In 1984, he fractured his ankle in the second game of the season and was placed on the injured reserve list. The longer than expected recovery from the injury and a broken hand, limited him to 10 games (5 starts) in 1985. He was used mostly as a punt returner until his release on October 14, 1986.

Detroit Lions
On October 16, 1986, Hill was claimed by the Detroit Lions to replace injured cornerback Bobby Watkins. He played in one game, before being cut and later re-signed for the last 2 games, to replace an injured John Bostic. He was waived on September 1, 1987.

Los Angeles Raiders
After the players went on a strike on the third week of the 1987 season, those games were canceled (reducing the 16 game season to 15) and the NFL decided that the games would be played with replacement players. Hill was signed to be a part of the Los Angeles Raiders replacement team, that was given the mock name "Masqueraiders" by the media. He went on to start all three games at cornerback and stayed a few weeks after the strike ended, before being released.

Winnipeg Blue Bombers (CFL)
Hill signed with the Winnipeg Blue Bombers of the Canadian Football League in May of 1988, where he became a dominant player. He was the team's starting cornerback for 5 seasons and was part of two Grey Cups championships. He received CFL All-Star honors in 1989 and 1990.

He retired at the end of the 1992 season, with team records for most career interceptions (47), most interceptions in one game (5) and career blocked punts (8). In 1996, he was inducted into the Winnipeg Football Club Hall of Fame.

Personal life
Hill worked as a banker in Winnipeg and also managed a Wal-Mart in Orangeville, Ontario.

References

External links
Rod Hill CFL Bio

1959 births
Living people
Martin Luther King High School (Detroit) alumni
Players of American football from Detroit
American football cornerbacks
Kentucky State Thorobreds football players
Dallas Cowboys players
Buffalo Bills players
Detroit Lions players
Los Angeles Raiders players
Winnipeg Blue Bombers players
National Football League replacement players